The 2020–21 Rink Hockey Euroleague is the 41st season of Europe's second club roller hockey tournament organised by World Skate Europe – Rink Hockey, and the 3rd season since it was renamed from CERS Cup to World Skate Europe Cup.

As the previous season was interrupted due to the COVID-19 pandemic in Europe, Lleida Llista Blava remain as defending champions, as the winners of the 2018–19 World Skate Europe Cup.

Teams
Each national federation could enter up to five teams.

A total of 26 teams was initially registered to play the WS Europe Cup, but 3 teams were invited to fill vacancies in the Euroleague. Invitations were sent according to the association ranking: Switzerland side Genève and French Coutras took the first two spots, and Portuguese side Barcelos took the third even though Portugal already had the maximum number of teams, as no team from Germany, Austria or England accepted the invitation. This way, the first draw had 23 participating teams, with both 2018–19 World Skate Europe Cup finalists and the best placed team form the seven best associations entering directly on the round of 16 and remaining teams playing a preliminary round.

On 18 October 2020, the World Skate Europe-Rink Hockey Committee decided to postpone preliminary round matches due to travel restrictions imposed by the COVID-19 pandemic in Europe. Later that month, on 29 October, it was announced that all WSERHC international competitions would be suspended until the end of the year.

On 17 January 2021, an updated list of clubs interested in participating under new conditions was published, with all but the seven teams from three associations withdrawing from the competition. A new format was established for the 7 teams, consisting of a final seven played at a single venue and one-legged matches, with title holders Lleida Llista Blava having a bye to the semi-finals and remaining teams entering the quarter-finals.

The labels in the parentheses show how each team qualified for the place of its starting round:
1st, 2nd, 3rd, 4th, etc.: League positions of the previous season
QF, SF, RU, W: Playoff finish round
Abd-: League positions of abandoned season due to the COVID-19 pandemic in Europe as determined by the national association
Dis-: The previous season was discarded due to the COVID-19 pandemic in Europe and the 2018–19 season positions were used for qualification

Notes

Round and draw dates
The schedule of the competition was as follows.

The original schedule of the competition, as planned before interruption, was as follows.

Final seven
The final seven will be played at the Poliesportiu d'Andorra in Andorra la Vella from 18 to 20 June 2021. It was originally set to be played from 30 April to 2 May 2021, but was postponed to a new date on 23 April 2021.

Bracket

Quarter-finals

Semi-finals

Final

See also
 2020–21 Rink Hockey Euroleague
 2020–21 Rink Hockey European Female League

References

External links
 Official website

World Skate Europe Cup
WS Europe Cup
WS Europe Cup